The 1940–41 Detroit Red Wings season was the 15th season for the Detroit NHL franchise, ninth as the Red Wings. The Red Wings made it to the Stanley Cup Final, losing to the Boston Bruins.

Offseason

Regular season

Final standings

Record vs. opponents

Schedule and results

Playoffs

(3) Detroit Red Wings vs. (4) New York Rangers

Detroit wins best-of-three series 2–1.

(3) Detroit Red Wings vs. (5) Chicago Black Hawks

Detroit wins best-of-three series 2–0.

(1) Boston Bruins vs. (3) Detroit Red Wings

Boston wins the Stanley Cup 4–0.

Player statistics

Regular season
Scoring

Goaltending

Playoffs
Scoring

Goaltending

Note: GP = Games played; G = Goals; A = Assists; Pts = Points; +/- = Plus-minus PIM = Penalty minutes; PPG = Power-play goals; SHG = Short-handed goals; GWG = Game-winning goals;
      MIN = Minutes played; W = Wins; L = Losses; T = Ties; GA = Goals against; GAA = Goals-against average;  SO = Shutouts;

Awards and records

Transactions

See also
1940–41 NHL season

References

Bibliography

External links
 

Detroit
Detroit
Detroit Red Wings seasons
Detroit Red Wings
Detroit Red Wings